Nguyen Cuong (born February 10, 1989), best known by his stage name Mr. T, is a Vietnamese beatboxer. He became more popular for his appearance in Vietnam's Got Talent (February 2012). He had been famous after his winning K-Battle Beatbox (Southeast Asia Beatbox) in Thailand on 9 November 2012. He's now a leader and trainer of Saigon Beatbox Club.

Career
Mr. T started beatboxing in 2007. He is one of the first beatboxers who popularized beatbox in Vietnam. He was a jury of Coca-Cola Phiêu Cùng Âm Nhạc (March to June 2011), Battle Beatbox X-Game Vietnam (6 November 2011). He's also open a contest named Battle Beatbox Mr. T (May 2011). In early 2012, he participated in Vietnam's Got Talent and was in the Semi-finals, but he didn't compete in Semi-final due to a complaint and disappointment about the show's proviso.

At the end of 2012, Mr. T won the K-Battle Beatbox in Korat, Thailand.

He's still a jury of many shows in 2013, such as Battle Beatbox SouthBeat (January 2013), Battle Beatbox X-Game Vietnam (November 2013)... Mr. T also won the Sprite Hip-hop Central, held by YanTV in 2013.

Mr. T Beatbox Tour
In 2013, Mr. T made a first time ever beatbox tour around Vietnam. A tour was held in 4 cities: Phan Thiet, Da Nang, Nha Trang, Da Lat. In 4 tours, he performed his personal skills of beatbox, include his performance in Thailand.

Personal life
Mr. T now lives in Ho Chi Minh City. He's been a leader of Saigon Beatbox Club since 2012. He's also a former member of the club. He has a snapback collection  and a Hip hop clothes shop in Ho Chi Minh City, and also a Tattoo store.

In 2013, Mr. T made a 19-video beatbox tutorial on his YouTube channel. During his tutorial videos, he sometimes used KRNFX and RoxorLoops beatbox. On 8 June 2014, he decided to teach beatbox at his house for 3 months, every Sunday afternoon.

Performance in competitions

See also
List of beatboxers

References

1989 births
Living people
Vietnamese musicians
Hip hop dancers
Beatboxers